Reality Check is the debut studio album by Deathline International, released on May 10, 1993, by COP International.

Track listing

Personnel
Adapted from the Reality Check liner notes.

Deathline International
 Shawn Brice (as Wiz Art) – vocals, trombone, producer
 Christian Petke (as Count Zero) – vocals, producer, cover art

Additional performers
 Maria Azevedo – backing vocals (5)
 John Carson – bass guitar
 Kim Hansen (as Kim X) – backing vocals
 Alfred Harth – saxophone, bass clarinet
 Seppl Niemeyer – drums
 Suzanne Santos – backing vocals

Production and design
 Armin Johnert – producer
 Stefan Noltemeyer – mastering
 Kim Phan – photography
 Evan Sornstein (Curium Design) – design, typography

Release history

References

External links 
 Reality Check at Discogs (list of releases)
 Reality Check at iTunes

1993 debut albums
Deathline International albums
COP International albums